Jan Plamper (born 1970) is a German professor of history at the University of Limerick. His research interests include Russian history, the history of emotions, sensory history, and the history of migration.

After obtaining a B.A. in History at Brandeis University in 1992, Plamper did social work for Memorial in St. Petersburg.

In 2001 he received his Ph.D. in History at the University of California, Berkeley, with a dissertation under the supervision of Yuri Slezkine on Joseph Stalin's personality cult. He subsequently taught at Tübingen University and from 2008 to 2012 was a Dilthey Fellow of the Fritz Thyssen Foundation at Ute Frevert's Center for the History of Emotions, Max Planck Institute for Human Development, in Berlin. From 2012 to 2021 he was professor of history at Goldsmiths, University of London, where he initiated the MA programs in Black British and Queer history. Plamper has held fellowships at Historisches Kolleg in Munich, Wissenschaftskolleg zu Berlin, Imre Kertész Kolleg Jena, and Alfried Krupp Wissenschaftskolleg Greifswald.

Selected works

Monographs 
Das neue Wir. Warum Migration dazugehört: Eine andere Geschichte der Deutschen. S. Fischer, 2019, .
The History of Emotions: An Introduction. Oxford University Press, 2015, .
The Stalin Cult: A Study in the Alchemy of Power. Yale University Press, 2012, .

Edited volumes and journal issues 
 Nikolai Mikhailov, Jan Plamper (eds.), Malen’kii chelovek i bol’shaia voina v istorii Rossii, seredina XIX – seredina XX v. Nestor-Istoriia, 2014, .
 Jan Plamper, Benjamin Lazier (eds.), Fear: Across the Disciplines, University of Pittsburgh Press, 2012, .
 Jan Plamper, Benjamin Lazier (eds.), Fear Beyond the Disciplines, Representations, no. 110 (2010)
 Jan Plamper, Schamma Schahadat, Marc Elie (eds.), Rossiiskaia imperiia chuvstv: Podkhody k kul’turnoi istorii emotsii. NLO, 2010, .
 Jan Plamper (ed.), Emotional Turn? Feelings in Russian History and Culture, Slavic Review 68, no. 2 (2009)
 Jan Plamper (ed.), Grenzgang in der Geschichte. Wissenschaftskulturen im internationalen Vergleich, Zeitschrift für Geschichtswissenschaft 52, no. 10 (2004)
 Klaus Heller, Jan Plamper (eds.), Personality Cults in Stalinism – Personenkulte im Stalinismus. V & R unipress, 2004, .

1970 births
Living people
20th-century German historians
Brandeis University alumni
University of California, Berkeley alumni